The Racovian Academy was a Socinian school operated from 1602 to 1638 by the Polish Brethren in Raków, Sandomierz Voivodeship of Lesser Poland.
The academy was founded in 1602 by his son, Jakub Sienieński. The zenith of the academy was 1616–1630. It was contemporaneous with the Calvinist Pińczów Academy, which was known "as the Sarmatian Athens". It numbered more than 1,000 students, including many foreigners. At this point it is estimated that ten to twenty percent of Polish intellectuals were Arians. 

The end of the Academy in 1638 was occasioned by the pretext of the alleged destruction of a roadside cross, by several students of the Academy, while on tour accompanied by a teacher Paludiusa Solomon. Jakub Zadzik, bishop of Kraków, Jerzy Ossoliński, voivode of Sandomierz, and Honorato Visconti, papal nuncio, forced the closure of the Academy and the destruction of all buildings by sentence of the Sejm in April 1638. Most of the teaching staff and students went into exile in Transylvania or the Netherlands.

Staff of the Academy 
 Jakub Sienieński (d. 1639) - founder and administrator.

Rectors:
 Krzysztof Brockajus - rector 1602-1610
 Paweł Krokier - rector 1610-1616
 Johannes Crellius, German - rector 1616-1621
 Marcin Ruar, German (Martin Ruarius) - rector 1621-1622
 Joachim Stegmann Sr., German, - rector 1627?-1630?
 Wawrzyniec Stegmann - rector 1634-1638

Teaching staff, in alphabetical order:
 Giovanni Battista de Cetis, Italian.
 Adam Gosławski (1577-1642)
 Jan Licinius, linguist
 Andrzej Lubieniecki Sr. (1521-1623)
 Stanisław Lubieniecki Sr. (c.1558-1633)
 Krzysztof Morsztyn Jr. (c.1570?-1642), son of Krzysztof Morsztyn Sr. (1522-1600)
 Hieronim Moskorzowski (1560-1625) - Racovian Catechism, 1605
 Salomon Paludius
 Piotr Stoiński Jr. (1565-1605), son of Pierre Statorius (known in Poland as Piotr Stoiński Sr. 1530-1591)
 Valentinus Smalcius, German (born Valentin Schmalz) (1572-1622) - The Raków New Testament 1606
 Jonasz Szlichtyng (1592-1661)
 Johannes Völkel, German (?-1618)
 Andrzej Wiszowaty (1608-1678)
 Andrzej Wojdowski (1565-1622)

Notable students at the academy, who became writers in the exile:
 Christopher Crellius (1622-1680), son of Johannes Crellius and father of Samuel Crellius and Dr. Christopher Crell of London.
 Andrzej Lubieniecki the younger (1590-1667), historian.
 Stanisław Lubieniecki the younger (1623-1675), astronomer, nephew of Andrzej Lubieniecki.

Influence 
See also main articles on Polish Brethren and Socinianism

The Racovian Academy served as a centre for the propagation of Socinian belief in both western and eastern Europe, in particular the Arian mission to the University of Altdorf near Nuremberg (1615), Dutch Remonstrants, Unitarians in Transylvania, even Muscovite sympathizers with Judaism.

The publications of the Academy till 1639, and of those of the teachers of the Academy in exile after 1640, are known to have influenced many English Unitarians such as Bartholomew Legatt (1575?-1612), Edward Wightman (1566-1612) and Gilbert Clerke (1626–c.1697) as well as Isaac Newton (1643–1727), and Voltaire (1694–1778),

References 

Arianism
Unitarianism
Education in Poland
Protestantism in the Polish–Lithuanian Commonwealth
1602 establishments in the Polish–Lithuanian Commonwealth